Nils Fixdal (20 November 1889 – 11 October 1972) was a Norwegian athlete who specialized in long jump and triple jump. He represented Haugesund IL. He was the brother of Knut Fixdal.

At the 1912 Summer Olympics he finished thirteenth in the long jump final with a jump of 6.71 metres and eighth in triple jump with 13.96 metres. He became Norwegian champion in long jump in 1912  and in triple jump in 1910 and 1913.

His personal best jump was 6.86 metres, achieved in July 1911 in Haugesund.
In triple jump he had a personal best of 14.34 metres, achieved in July 1913 in Haugesund.

References

1889 births
1972 deaths
Norwegian male triple jumpers
Norwegian male long jumpers
Athletes (track and field) at the 1912 Summer Olympics
Olympic athletes of Norway
20th-century Norwegian people